Stary Most may refer to:
 Stary Most, Pomeranian Voivodeship, a village in Poland
 Starý most (Bratislava), a bridge in Bratislava, Slovakia

See also 
 Old Bridge (disambiguation)
 Stari Most (disambiguation)